The IA Tower (Industriel Alliance Tower or Tour Industrielle Alliance), originally called Industrial Life Tower, is a 23 stories high rise building located in downtown Montreal, Quebec, Canada.  Inaugurated in 1986, it was one of the first postmodernist high rises built in downtown Montreal.

History  

The IA Tower was the result of a joint venture between the then Industrial Life Insurance Company and First Québec Corporation. Built on McGill College Avenue, the tower was designed  to be a premium grade-A office building

The original tenants included Industrial Life, Dominion Securities Pitfield, Ernst and Whinney, Quantum group and Rolland Inc. Following the 1987 merger between Industrial Life Insurance and Alliance Nationale, the tower was renamed with the Industrielle Alliance name. 

Located between Boulevard De Maisonneuve Ouest and Avenue du Président-Kennedy, the IA Tower is ornamented by city furnitures and the public artwork Le banc des secrets by Lea Vivot.

Architecture 
Designed by the Montreal firm  Tolchinsky and Goodz, the IA Tower is made of Quebec polished granite. The building is larger at the last three floors and is designed to provide a maximum view of the Mont-Royal. Due to its conception, every floor apart from the three top floors has eight corner offices.

Notable tenants

References

Postmodern architecture in Canada
Skyscrapers in Montreal
Buildings and structures completed in 1986
1986 establishments in Quebec